SPECvirt_sc2010 is a computer benchmark that evaluates the performance of a server computer for virtualization. It is available from the Standard Performance Evaluation Corporation (SPEC). It was introduced in July, 2010.

The SPECvirt_sc2010 benchmark measures the maximum number of workloads that a platform can simultaneously run while maintaining specific quality of service metrics.  Each workload, called a tile, consists of a specific set of virtual machines.

In addition to generating results that show performance, the benchmark can also be used to generate performance per watt results.

The SPECvirt_sc2010 was not supported by SPEC from February 26, 2014  and its successor is SPECvirt_sc2013.

See also
 Performance per watt
 VMmark

References

External links
  Official SPECvirt website

Benchmarks (computing)
Virtualization_software